Tanzeem Al-Firdous is a teacher, researcher and author of Urdu language in Pakistan. She has been serving as the president of the Urdu Department of Karachi University since May 2016. She teaches Urdu to local and foreign students and also sets the curriculum for Urdu credentials / diplomas. She is the author of more than half a dozen published books.

Education 
Tanzeem Al-Firdous did English, Sindhi and Persian language courses from Karachi University and after doing Masters in Urdu Language and Literature from Karachi University in 1989, she did PhD in Urdu Language and Literature in 2004. The title is "The Uniqueness and Importance of Imam Ahmad Raza in Urdu Naat Poetry".

Teaching 
She has been involved in teaching in various institutions since about 1992. She has been working as a lecturer in Government College for Women, Pakistan Employees Cooperative Housing Society for three years and is now (from 2016 to April 2017) the head of the department.

Publications 
The titles of some of her printed books are as follows.
 Poetry Collection: The Scene Should Change Published 2016, Worksheet, Faisalabad
 Criticism: Distinguished Excellent Personality and Art, Academy of Literature Pakistan
 Word Selection: Raza Ali Wahshat (Compilation), 2017, Oxford University Press, Karachi
 Word Selection: Shibli Nomani (Compilation), 2015, Oxford University Press, Karachi
 Word Selection: Bahadur Shah Zafar (Compilation), 2015, Oxford University Press, Karachi
 Word Selection: Amir Minai (Compilation), 2014, Yadgar-e-Ghalib Karachi
 Some Classical Genres of Urdu Poetry: Yadgar-e-Ghalib Karachi, 2013
 War of Independence 1857 New Angles of Historical Facts, 2012, Worksheet, Karachi; First published in 2010
 Foot Falls Echo, a collection of English fiction by Mumtaz Shireen, 2006, Manzil Academy, Karachi.

Unpublished books
 Stories of East and West (compilation), National Book Foundation, Islamabad
 Selection of Mirza Ghalib's letters (compiled), Oxford University Press, Karachi

Articles 
 Linguistic Formations and Local Effects in the Poetry of Maulana Ahmad Raza Khan: Monthly Maarif-e-Raza Karachi, April 2000.
 The Most Important Motivation of Maulana Ahmad Raza Khan's Naat Recitation: Monthly Maarif Raza Karachi, November 2004
 Variety of forms in the poetry of Allama Maulana Ahmad Raza Khan (may Allah have mercy on him): Monthly Maarif-e-Raza Silver Jubilee Annual November 2005
 The position of Maulana Ahmad Raza Khan and Allama Iqbal in the Ejtehad issues of the time. Allama Iqbal's Concept of Ijtihad (Collection of Articles) 2008.

References 

Pakistani educators
Pakistani writers
University of Karachi alumni
1966 births
Living people